By-elections are held in South Korea when a political office becomes vacant.

List 

 2011 Seoul mayoral by-election
 2011
 2012
 2013
 2014
 2015
 2016
 2017
 2018
 2019
 2020
 2021 South Korean by-elections
 2022 South Korean by-elections
 2022 Sangdang by-election

See also 

Elections in South Korea